Ravi K. Chandran is an Indian cinematographer and film director who predominantly works in Hindi, Malayalam, and Tamil-language cinema. He is the founding member of the Indian Society of Cinematographers (ISC) and has won two Filmfare Awards and one Southern Filmfare Award.

Career

Ravi was born as the 7th child in a Malayali family to Kunjan Pillai and Padmini Amma and brought up in Maduranthakam. His eldest brother, cinematographer Ramachandra Babu, who went to Pune Film Institute in the seventies was the major influence and inspiration for Ravi. Growing up in the 70's, amidst of the new wave French cinema, names like Truffaut and Gordard become familiar to Ravi when he was very young. Latter part time closet painter, Ravi joined his brother as an assistant cinematographer, learning the technical aspects of the job. 

In 1984 Ravi K.Chandran started his career working in Malayalam films as an assistant to his brother, cinematographer, Ramachandra Babu ISC and later with his friend Rajiv Menon. He got his first break as a cinematographer in a Malayalam film Kilukkampetti and worked his way up until he shot the legendary  Virasat which won many awards to Ravi. Since then there is no looking back. He is a pioneer in using new equipment and cameras in to the Indian film industry like akila crane, kino flo lights, mole beams, hawk lenses, sky panels, celeb lights, space lights. His “BLACK" movie was featured in American cinematographer's magazine. Kodak international cinematographer calendar, and the cover of the ALEXA camera brochure.

His best known works are Virasat, Dil Chahta Hai, Kannathil Muthamittal, Kannezhuthi Pottum Thottu, Black, Fanaa, and Saawariya.

Personal life

Ravi Chandran is the younger brother of K. Ramachandra Babu, who himself is a noted cinematographer. He is married to Hemalata and currently resides in Mumbai with his two sons. One of his sons, Santhana Krishnan, also followed his father's footsteps as a cinematographer.

Filmography

As cinematographer

As director

Awards and nominations
Filmfare Awards/Filmfare Awards South
 1998: Best Cinematographer - Virasat
 2002: Best Cinematographer – South - Kannathil Muthamittal
 2006: Best Cinematographer - Black

Star Screen Awards
 2002: Nominated, Star Screen Award for Best Cinematography - Dil Chahta Hai

Zee Cine Awards
 2004: Nominated, Zee Cine Award for Best Cinematography - Yuva
 2004: Nominated, Best Cinematography - Calcutta Mail

Vijay Awards
 2011: Nominated, Vijay Award for Best Cinematography - 7aum Arivu

References

External links
 
 
Interview: Nowhere Else in the world people clap for a cinematographer: Ravi K Chandran
"Spotted: Ravi K Chandran shooting for My Name is Khan" - Rediff.com

Living people
People from Kanchipuram district
Tamil film cinematographers
Malayalam film cinematographers
Filmfare Awards South winners
20th-century Indian photographers
21st-century Indian photographers
Telugu film cinematographers
Cinematographers from Tamil Nadu
1973 births